Datuk Santokh Singh s/o Gurdial Singh  (born 22 June 1952) is a retired Malaysian football player.
His wife is Taljit Kaur and has 3 children, Kiran Kaur, Sukhveer Singh and Rajveer Singh.

Career Overview
Born in Setapak, Santokh played in the Selangor FA team from 1972 to 1985, winning 9 Malaysia Cups as captain of the team.

Santokh was a player for Malaysia national football team in the 1970s and 1980s, and played alongside the late Mokhtar Dahari, Soh Chin Aun and R. Arumugam. He participated in the team that qualified to the 1980 Moscow Olympic Games, though he never featured in the finals of the tournament due to the Games' boycott by Malaysia. Santokh was part of Malaysia 1974 Asian Games bronze medalist in Tehran, but did not play in any of the matches due to injury before the start of the tournament. He also won the Southeast Asian Games gold medal in 1977 and 1979.

His partnership with Soh Chin Aun was said to be the most solid defence in the much-feared Malaysian team. In February 1999, Asian Football Confederation recognize Santokh achievement of representing the country 145 times (match including Olympic qualification, against national 'B' football team, club side and selection side), 119 caps is against full national team. Thus, Asian Football Confederation include him into the AFC Century Club in 1999. In 2004, he was inducted in Olympic Council of Malaysia's Hall of Fame.

On 17 September 2014, FourFourTwo list him on their list of the top 25 Malaysian footballers of all time. In 2020, Goal.com had selected him on their list of  The best Malaysia XI of all time.

Accolades and legacy
In 2011, Santokh was bestowed the honour of the Panglima Mahkota Wilayah by the Yang Dipertuan Agong of Malaysia, which bears the title Datuk. during the occasion of Federal Territory Day. In the same year, the Sultan of Selangor also honoured him with the Order of Sultan Sharafuddin Idris Shah, carrying the title Dato'.

In 2016, he was the reference for one of the members of Team Malaysia in "Ola Bola".

Honours

Orders
  :
  Member of the Order of the Defender of the Realm (AMN) (1980)
  :
  Knight Commander of the Order of the Territorial Crown (PMW) - Datuk (2011)
  :
  Knight Companion of the Order of Sultan Sharafuddin Idris Shah (DSIS) - Dato' (2011)

See also
 List of men's footballers with 100 or more international caps

References

External links
 Profile at selangorfc.com
 Profile at Olympic Council of Malaysia  Sports Museum and Hall of Fame

1952 births
Living people
Malaysian footballers
Malaysia international footballers
1976 AFC Asian Cup players
Sportspeople from Kuala Lumpur
Malaysian sportspeople of Indian descent
Malaysian Sikhs
Malaysian people of Punjabi descent
Selangor FA players
Asian Games bronze medalists for Malaysia
Asian Games medalists in football
Southeast Asian Games gold medalists for Malaysia
Southeast Asian Games bronze medalists for Malaysia
Southeast Asian Games medalists in football
Association football defenders
Medalists at the 1974 Asian Games
Competitors at the 1973 Southeast Asian Peninsular Games
Footballers at the 1974 Asian Games
Members of the Order of the Defender of the Realm
FIFA Century Club